Jack O'Rourke (13 July 1928 – 11 April 2008) was an Australian rules footballer who played in the Victorian Football League (VFL) in between 1949 and 1953 for the Richmond Football Club.

References 
 Hogan P: The Tigers of Old, Richmond FC, Melbourne 1996

External links
 Vale Jack O'Rourke
 
 

Richmond Football Club players
Australian rules footballers from Victoria (Australia)
1928 births
2008 deaths